Oren Biton (or Bitton, ; born 16 June 1994) is an Israeli footballer who plays as a left-back for Hapoel Haifa.

Early life
Bitton was born in Atlit, Israel to a family of Sephardic Jewish descent.

Career
On 10 May 2014, Biton made his debut for Hapoel Haifa, as a 85th-minute substitute for Or Ostvind in a 1–2 away loss against Maccabi Petah Tikva. In the 2014–15 season, Biton played only 9 game at the league.

Ahead of the 2015–16 season he was loaned to the Liga Leumit club Hapoel Nazareth Illit. On 11 March 2016, he received a red card against Maccabi Ahi Nazareth. On 11 April 2016, he scored his debut career goal in a 4–1 win against Hapoel Afula. Biton played 33 games and scored 2 goals.

On 15 June 2016, Biton signed for four years to Hapoel Ironi Kiryat Shmona. In Kiryat Shmona did his hacking and became important player at the club's line-up.

On 14 March 2017, he signed a contract for five years to Hapoel Be'er Sheva and will sign in 2017–18 season.

On 3 August 2020 signed in Beitar Jerusalem for couple of years.

References

1994 births
Living people
Israeli footballers
Israeli Sephardi Jews
Israeli Mizrahi Jews
Footballers from Haifa District
Hapoel Haifa F.C. players
Hapoel Nof HaGalil F.C. players
Hapoel Ironi Kiryat Shmona F.C. players
Hapoel Be'er Sheva F.C. players
Beitar Jerusalem F.C. players
Israel under-21 international footballers
Israeli Premier League players
Liga Leumit players
Israeli people of Moroccan-Jewish descent
Association football fullbacks